Dhaka Elevated Expressway is Bangladesh's first elevated expressway project, which will connect the Shahjalal airport with Kutubkhali via Mohakhali, Tejgaon, and Kamalapur of Dhaka, Bangladesh. It is one of the largest infrastructure projects taken up by the incumbent government to ease traffic congestion in the capital.

Contracts for the expressway
The Italian-Thai Development Corporation Limited has entered a $1.062 billion contract with China Railway Construction Corporation (CRCC) for building the Dhaka Elevated Expressway.

Developments
Prime Minister Sheikh Hasina inaugurated construction of the 21 km expressway on April 30, 2011, with a hope that it will be completed in three and a half years. However, it has not been completed as of 2022. It is expected that the project might be completed by late 2023 (might be delayed to 2024 or even later because of the COVID-19 Global Pandemic)

Controversy

See Also
 List of roads in Bangladesh
 List of megaprojects in Bangladesh

References 

Transport in Dhaka
Expressways in Bangladesh
Roads in Dhaka